Chlorostrymon is a genus of butterflies in the family Lycaenidae. The species of this genus are found in the Nearctic and Neotropical realms.

Species
Chlorostrymon simaethis (Drury, 1773) – silver-banded hairstreak
Chlorostrymon telea (Hewitson, 1868) – telea hairstreak
Chlorostrymon maesites (Herrich-Schäffer, 1864) – amethyst hairstreak
Chlorostrymon clenchi Comstock & Huntington, 1943 Dominica, Guadelope
Chlorostrymon kuscheli (Ureta, 1949)
Chlorostrymon orbis Johnson & Smith, 1993 Jamaica

References

External links

Eumaeini
Lycaenidae of South America
Lycaenidae genera
Taxa named by William J. Clench